Indubil is a slang spoken in the Democratic Republic of the Congo. It has been noted since around the sixties - musician Sam Mangwana mentions its use in lyrics before the seventies. Indubil was originally rooted in Lingala but in its continued evolution it has given birth to Kindubile, the youth language in Katanga which uses Swahili as its matrix language.

As of 2010, Indubil is a lively slang and continues to evolve.

References

Languages of the Democratic Republic of the Congo
Slang
African Urban Youth Languages
Languages attested from the 1960s
Lingala language
Swahili